

This is a list of films and television series which feature Wing Chun, a Chinese martial art style and form, either as the main topic, a plot device, or as demonstration means of the martial art.

References

Wing Chun

Films, Wing Chun
Martial arts films